Pennsylvania Route 240 (PA 240) is an  state highway located in Indiana and Cambria counties in Pennsylvania.  The western terminus is at PA 286 in Commodore.  The eastern terminus is at U.S. Route 219 (US 219) near Cherry Tree.

Route description

PA 240 begins at an intersection with PA 286 in Green Township, Indiana County, heading southeast on a two-lane undivided road. The route heads through wooded areas and crosses a R.J. Corman Railroad line, curving east into a mix of farmland and woodland with some homes. The road heads through open farmland and turns southeast, passing through the residential community of Cookport. PA 240 turns northeast into more rural areas of farms and woods with some residences, heading east again. Farther east, the route comes to an intersection with PA 580 in the community of Uniontown. Past this intersection, the road heads into wooded areas with some homes. The route enters Susquehanna Township in Cambria County and becomes Peg Run Road, turning northeast and east through more forested areas of residences. PA 240 crosses the West Branch Susquehanna River and comes to its eastern terminus at an intersection with US 219.

Major intersections

See also

References

External links

Pennsylvania Highways: PA 240

240
Transportation in Indiana County, Pennsylvania
Transportation in Cambria County, Pennsylvania